Elaphromyia siva is a species of tephritid or fruit flies in the genus Elaphromyia of the family Tephritidae.

Distribution
Sri Lanka.

References

Tephritinae
Insects described in 1917
Diptera of Asia